Saint Michael's School, also referred to as SMS or St. Mike's, is an American Catholic parochial school whose motto, "Fides et Ratio" (Latin for "Faith and Reason") describes the school's goal of having their students become independent thinkers and grow into responsible young adults grounded in Catholic values.

St. Michael's, which offers nursery through 8th grade, was founded in 1929 and is located in Cranford, New Jersey, United States.  As of 2013, the principal is Mrs. Sandy Miragliotta.

St. Michael's follows the New Jersey Core Content Curriculum Standards in addition to Curriculum Guidelines set forth by the Archdiocese of Newark.  It is also independently accredited by the Middle States Association for Elementary Schools, most recently in 2010.

St. Michael's students consistently outperform the national and archdiocesan averages on standardized MAP Growth tests. 

The school has both a Before-care and Aftercare program

Extracurricular sports are offered by the St. Michael's Sports Association.

External links 
 Saint Michael's School Website
National Center for Education Statistics data for Saint Michael's School

Schools in Union County, New Jersey
Educational institutions established in 1929
Private elementary schools in New Jersey
Private middle schools in New Jersey
1929 establishments in New Jersey